Bacchisa fortunei, or the blue pear twig borer, is a species of beetle in the family Cerambycidae. It was described by Thomson in 1857. It is known from Japan.

Subspecies
 Bacchisa fortunei flavicornis (Kono, 1933)
 Bacchisa fortunei fortunei (Thomson, 1857)
 Bacchisa fortunei japonica (Gahan, 1901)

References

fortunei
Beetles described in 1857